Kelly Flynn (October 4, 1954 – March 3, 2021) was an American politician who served as a Republican member of the Montana House of Representatives from 2011 to 2019. He was elected to House District 68 which represents the Townsend area.

He died of kidney and lung cancer on March 3, 2021, in Helena, Montana, at age 66.

References

1954 births
2021 deaths
Republican Party members of the Montana House of Representatives
People from Townsend, Montana